Saint Æthelburh (died after 686) or Ethelburga, founder and first Abbess of the double monastery of Barking, was the sister of Earconwald, Bishop of London.

Life
The main source for Æthelburh is Bede's Historia ecclesiastica gentis Anglorum which recounts the foundation of Barking, early miracles there, and Æthelburh's death (Book IV, Chapters 6 to 10). Bede describes Æthelburg as "upright in life and constantly planning for the needs of her community".

Some time before he became bishop of London in 675, Earconwold founded a double monastery at Barking for his sister, and a monastery at Chertsey for himself. Barking appears to have already been established by the time of the plague in 664.

A charter, believed genuine and drafted by Bishop Eorcenwald in the reign of King Sebbi of Essex (reigned –c. 694), records a grant of lands in Essex by a certain Æthelred to Æthelburh and Barking. This is dated to between 686 and 688.

The 9th century Old English Martyrology records a vision, recounted by a nun of Barking, who saw Æthelburh being drawn up into heaven by golden chains. She was buried at Barking. The Old English Martyrology records her feast day as 11 October. She is commemorated by the Orthodox Church on 11 October. Her successor as abbess was Hildelith.

Ethelburga founded the church of All Hallows Berkyngechirche (now known as All Hallows Barking or All Hallows by the Tower in the City of London on land given to her by her brother Eorconwald c. 675.

The church of St Ethelburga the Virgin in the City of London is dedicated to her. It survived the Great Fire and the Blitz but was extensively damaged in an IRA attack in 1993; however, it has been restored and is now a centre for international reconciliation.  An area near Battersea Park and Albert Bridge was also named after her (Ethelburga Street, the Ethelburga Estate and Ethelburga Primary School in 1968-2000). 

Other churches dedicated to Æthelburh include the Grade II listed St Ethelburga's at Great Givendale, near Pocklington in the East Riding of Yorkshire.

Ethelburga is remembered in the Church of England with a commemoration on 11 October.

References

External links
 

7th-century births
7th-century deaths
East Saxon saints
Anglo-Saxon abbesses
7th-century Christian saints
7th-century English women
Female saints of medieval England
7th-century English people
Medieval landowners
Anglican saints